Massereene Upper is a barony in southwest County Antrim, Northern Ireland. It roughly matches the former district of Killultagh. It includes settlements such as Crumlin, Glenavy, Lower Ballinderry, Maghaberry and Aghalee. To its east lies Belfast Lough, and it is bordered by four other baronies: Massereene Lower to the north; Belfast Upper to the east; Castlereagh Upper to the south-east; and Iveagh Lower, Lower Half to the south-west.

List of settlements
Below is a list of settlements in Massereene Upper:

Towns
Crumlin
Lisburn

Villages
Aghagallon
Aghalee
Glenavy
Maghaberry

Population centres
Lower Ballinderry
Upper Ballinderry
Gawley's Gate
Lane Ends
Leathemstown
Pond Park
Stoneyford

List of civil parishes
Below is a list of civil parishes in Massereene Upper:
Aghagallon
Aghalee
Ballinderry
Blaris (split with barony of Iveagh Lower, Lower Half)
Camlin
Derriaghy (also partly in barony of Belfast Upper)
Glenavy
Lambeg (split with barony of Castlereagh Upper)
Magheragall
Magheramesk
Tullyrusk

References

 
Clandeboye